= Drioma =

Mythological entity

According to Slavic mythology, Drioma (in Russian Дрёма) is a spirit of the evening and the night. She affects the appearance of an old, kindly woman, with soft hands, or a little man with a soft, lulling voice. Drioma walks the evening beneath the windows, and when darkness falls, enters the house through cracks and fissures. She comes to see children, asleep with their eyes closed, arranges the bedspread, and strokes their hair. This spirit is less gentle with adults, in whom she inspires nightmares.
